General elections were held in Samoa on 4 March 2011, to determine the composition of the 15th Parliament. Two parties contested the election, the ruling Human Rights Protection Party (HRPP), which had been in power since 1982, led by Prime Minister Tuilaepa Sailele Malielegaoi and the newly founded Tautua Samoa Party (TSP) led by Va'ai Papu Vailupe, which several minor parties had merged into. The election occurred following amendments to the electoral act in 2009, including the introduction of the Monotoga law, a requirement for aspiring candidates to dedicate traditional village service and commitments. As a result, three TSP aspiring candidates, including a challenger for the prime minister's seat, were disqualified by the Supreme Court for failing to satisfy this law. 

The HRPP won re-election with a simple majority of 29 seats, while three cabinet ministers were unseated. The TSP secured 13 seats and independents won seven. Only two of the seven female candidates were successful. Following the election, all the independents joined the HRPP, handing the party a two-thirds majority with 36 seats. Several successful candidates were later stripped of their seats by the Supreme Court due to electoral petitions, which included the TSP leader. As a result, the TSP replaced Va'ai Papu Vailupe with deputy leader Palusalue Faapo II.

Background

During the previous general election held in 2006, the ruling Human Rights Protection Party won a landslide victory, winning 33 seats. The opposition Samoan Democratic United Party (SDUP) secured ten seats, and independents won the remaining six. The SDUP later lost one seat due to an electoral petition.
Later that year, in August 2006, the SDUP removed its leader Le Mamea Ropati and replaced him with deputy leader Asiata Sale'imoa Va'ai. The SDUP then fragmented and led to the departure of two MPs from the party, including Le Mamea Ropati. As a result, the SDUP’s recognition as a parliamentary party ceased because it fell below the eight-seat threshold, and the parliament classified the party's remaining MPs as independents.

On 11 May 2007, long-serving O le Ao o le Malo (head of state) Susuga Malietoa Tanumafili II died. Parliament unanimously voted for Tui Ātua Tupua Tamasese Efi, a member of the council of deputies, former prime minister and son of former co-head of state Tupua Tamasese Meaʻole, to succeed Malietoa. 

In September 2009, the government switched the country from right to left-hand driving to enable less costly vehicle imports from Australia and New Zealand. The change was controversial as most vehicles were on the left-hand drive, generating one of the largest protests in Samoan history. The same month, Samoa was devastated by an earthquake and tsunami that claimed the lives of 158 people in the country. The prime minister faced criticism for allegedly mishandling relief funds.

Eleven opposition MPs from the SDUP and independents formed the Tautua Samoa Party in 2008 to provide parliamentary opposition to the HRPP. Nine members of parliament subsequently aligned themselves with the new party. However, in 2009, speaker of parliament, Tolofuaivalelei Falemoe Leiʻataua, declared their seats vacant and ordered by-elections to take place. The speaker argued the TSP members had broken parliamentary protocol by joining a new party during the legislative session. But the Supreme Court later ruled the speaker's decision to be unlawful, cancelling the by-elections and restoring the TSP MPs. The following year, parliament passed an amendment forbidding MPs from changing parties; those who would change their affiliation would have to run in a by-election to retain their seat. After the amendment's passage, only three MPs remained official TSP members and competed in subsequent by-elections; one member successfully retained his seat unopposed, while another secured a narrow win. Former party chair Lealailepule Rimoni Aiafi was narrowly defeated by an HRPP member. In September 2010, the Samoa Party merged into the TSP. Feo Nemaia Esau, the Samoa Party's president, said the purpose of the merger was to strengthen the opposition. The TSP initially intended to refrain from electing a party leader until after the election to choose one of the successful parliamentary candidates. However, Prime Minister Tuilaʻepa described the party as a "headless monster" due to the absence of a TSP leader and challenged the party to select a leader before the election. The party elected Va'ai Papu Vailupe, son of former prime minister Vaai Kolone, as leader in December 2010.

Electoral system 

During the time of the 2011 election, parliament was composed of 49 members, with all serving a five-year term. Forty-seven members represented forty-one village-based constituencies, of which six of the larger electorates had two MPs, while the rest were single-member constituencies. Two members, elected from a nationwide constituency, represented individual voters, mostly non-ethnic Samoans and individuals with partial Samoan ancestry. Except for the latter, to qualify, candidates were required to hold a matai title, while all were elected using the first-past-the-post voting system. Candidates were also required to have reached the age of 21 and have resided in Samoa for at least three years before the nomination date. In 2009, parliament amended the electoral act to include the monotoga law, a requirement for individuals to dedicate service to their respective villages to qualify as candidates. Under the monotoga law, a requirement for parliamentary hopefuls to qualify as candidates was for their village mayors to approve their nomination.

Voters 

Universal suffrage was introduced in 1991, permitting all Samoan citizens over the age of 21 to vote in person. Voting registration usually closes six months before a general election and re-opens immediately after. Voters could elect to enrol in a constituency rather than the one where they reside by right of significant family ties or matai titles. As a result, the population of constituencies and the constituency's voter roll have not always correlated. Voters residing in Apia that were registered to vote in constituencies outside the capital but were unable to travel to their electoral districts on election day were permitted to cast a special vote at designated polling stations.

Eastern Samoans 

Before the election, the electoral commissioner of American Samoa announced that American Samoans who cast ballots in elections held in the Independent State of Samoa would subsequently be ineligible to vote in their own country. Under United States electoral laws, voters can lose their right to vote if they cast a ballot in another country's election.

Schedule 

Prime Minister Tuila‘epa announced the election date on 5 October 2010. The 14th Parliament was dissolved on 27 January 2011, while candidates could register from 18 to 25 February. The campaign season ended on 3 March, and the mandatory removal of campaign material from public areas occurred. Election Day and the day prior were declared public holidays by the government to allow voters to travel to their electoral districts if need be. The return of the writ occurred on 21 March.

Parties and candidates 

A total of 159 candidates competed in the election, and two parties contested; the ruling HRPP, led by prime minister Tuilaʻepa Saʻilele Malielegaoi, and the TSP, led by Va'ai Papu Vailupe. Of the HRPP candidates nominated, 79 contested, while there were 40 TSP and Independent candidates each. Seven contenders were women, down from 19 in the 2006 election. As four constituencies consisted solely of HRPP candidates, while two had members of the ruling party running unopposed, the HRPP was guaranteed six seats.

Disqualified candidates 

Several parliamentary hopefuls either withdrew or had their candidacy revoked. In December 2010, veteran politician Tuilagi Motutoa Vavae Leo II, a former deputy speaker and HRPP candidate, was convicted by the Supreme Court of attempted sexual assault, terminating his campaign. 

A month before the election, the electoral commissioner disqualified three TSP candidates. The mayors in their respective villages had refused to sign their nomination forms due to their supposed failure to satisfy the monotoga law. One of the rejects, Tu‘ula Tuitui of the Saleapaga village, who was vying for the prime minister's seat, stated he had provided proof to the mayor that he had worked for the village in various ways, notably by taking part in recovery work after the 2009 earthquake and tsunami. Tu‘ula also claimed that chiefs and orators of Saleapaga had repeatedly requested he not run against the prime minister. The three TSP rejects unsuccessfully challenged their disqualifications in court. TSP founder Lealailepule Rimoni Aiafi criticised the disqualifications and emphasised how no HRPP candidates were affected. However, he also highlighted that the TSP declined to have any candidates from the ruling party disqualified, expressing, "we believe that anybody can run, [and] exercise their right to compete in the election."

Public servants 

Shortly before the poll, a cabinet directive ordered public servants running for Parliament to resign in contravention of Samoa's electoral act, which permits public servants to take special leave to contest elections. The TSP denounced the order as unconstitutional.

Campaign 

The Human Rights Protection Party, which had been in power since 1982, promised to focus on health, education, agriculture, infrastructural development, the development of renewable energy, and a pledge to "turn Samoa into the sports hub of the Pacific". In a speech on 22 February, the Prime Minister emphasised the party's maturity and experience in government. He promised continuity in policies and drew attention to what he described as the government's major achievements in recent years: the election of the head of state; the development of infrastructure; economic growth, and the development of businesses and the private sector; a well-managed budget; the hosting of the 2007 South Pacific Games; the switching from right- to left-hand driving throughout the country and the government's response to the 2009 earthquake and tsunami. For the future, the prime minister announced a broad range of policies to improve Samoans' health, including an increase in the number of locally trained medical staff, an increase in the number of hospitals, a policy of compulsory twice-a-year testing of all Samoans to detect cancer in advance, and the promotion of organic farming, along with a "bonus scheme" to reduce the use of chemicals and pesticides in agriculture, to facilitate healthier diets. He stated that these promises could all be realistically financed and concluded: "Your one vote can set the direction of Samoa for the next five years. It’s very important who you choose because you could benefit or you will bring a curse on you and your family for the next five years. So vote for the HRPP and be blessed". Tuilaʻepa predicted that the HRPP would win 40 seats. Days before the election, the prime minister promised to step down at the next election if his party remained in government.

The Tautua Samoa Party promised to focus on lowering the cost of living and halting the government's Casino and Gambling Bill, which would legalise casino gaming in the country. The Value Added Goods and Services Tax would be abolished; pensions would be raised for the elderly; children below the age of 12 would receive free health care. The party also promised to "encourage farming and develop agriculture", "lower the cost of electricity and other utilities", " develop education and health services through the raising of salaries and enforcing compulsory education", and promote the development of the private sector. Asked how these promises would be funded, particularly considering the promised abolition of VAGST, the party's deputy leader, Palusalue Faapo II, stated that "God will provide for us" and that the party would seek additional international aid. He added that the HRPP government had "wasted millions on unnecessary developments such as the new buildings towering over everything in Apia" and that under a TSP government, all public spending would be transparent and accountable.

Conduct 

The TSP accused the HRPP of engaging in the practice of vote buying and treating, especially on the day before the election. The prime minister dismissed these allegations and claimed that it was Samoan tradition. He also said that gift-giving was no different to politicians in other nations financing their campaigns.

A total of 300 police officers were present to safeguard the electoral process. In the lead-up to the election, the Samoan police force conducted regular safety briefings, despite the lack of imminent threats. Campaigning ceased at midnight on 3 March; on election day, polling stations closed at 3 pm local time, although other stations, including special polling booths, remained open past that time. Individuals who had not voted but had been waiting in line at stations that closed at 3 pm were allowed to cast their ballots. There were no reports of violence, and a liquor ban was in place during the election. The Pacific Islands Forum, which sent a delegation to observe the electoral process, declared the election free, fair and peaceful.

Results  

Final results showed the HRPP retained its majority, winning 29 seats, while the TSP secured 13 and independents won seven. Around 90% of registered voters participated in the election. Three cabinet ministers, such as justice minister Unasa Mesi Galo, lost re-election. Only two female candidates, including Fiamē Naomi Mataʻafa, were elected. Two candidates were elected unopposed.

By constituency

Double member constituencies

Uncontested
The following two candidates were elected without opposition:

Aftermath

Following the election, all seven independents joined the HRPP, giving the ruling caucus a two-thirds majority with a total of 36 seats. Fonotoe Pierre Lauofo, the member of parliament for Anoama'a West, was elected deputy leader of the HRPP and subsequently became the new deputy prime minister. He succeeded Misa Telefoni Retzlaff, who opted not to seek re-election and retire. Among other new cabinet ministers was Le Mamea Ropati, a former opposition leader who led the Samoan Democratic United Party in the previous election cycle.

The Tautua Samoa Party’s founder and chief whip, Lealailepule Rimoni Aiafi, expressed confidence that the party would perform well in the next election cycle. He also stressed the importance of party unity and stated, "Five years from now, we should definitely win. This [election] is a good start for us, and we have a good opposition, so we should start our campaign right now, and that's what we are going to do now, is prove to the people and educate them and tell them what Samoa needs, and the next election should be a[n] easy battle for us."

Several members of parliament later lost their seats by order of the Supreme Court due to electoral petitions. Among these individuals were opposition leader Va'ai Papu Vailupe and the associate minister of natural resources and environment, Taua Kitiona Seuala. By-elections subsequently took place in July in the ousted member’s constituencies, all were won by HRPP candidates. These results increased the ruling caucus’ seat share to 37, whilst the opposition lost a seat, leaving them with 12 members.

Following Va'ai's ousting, the Tautua Samoa Party elected deputy leader Palusalue Fa’apo II to replace him as leader of the party and the opposition. The party also elected former speaker of parliament, A'eau Peniamina, deputy leader.

The 15th parliamentary session commenced on 18 March 2011.

See also

List of members of the Legislative Assembly of Samoa (2011–2016)
2011 Samoan by-elections

References

External links
 Official results

Elections in Samoa
Samoa
General election
Election and referendum articles with incomplete results